Roland Fischnaller (born 19 September 1980) is an Italian snowboarder who is a 6-time Olympian, having competed in the 2002, 2006, 2010, 2014, 2018, and 2022 Winter Olympics in Men's Parallel Giant Slalom, as well as the Men's Parallel Slalom in 2014.

References

External links

Italian male snowboarders
Olympic snowboarders of Italy
Snowboarders at the 2002 Winter Olympics
Snowboarders at the 2006 Winter Olympics
Snowboarders at the 2010 Winter Olympics
Snowboarders at the 2014 Winter Olympics
Snowboarders at the 2018 Winter Olympics
Snowboarders at the 2022 Winter Olympics
1980 births
Living people
Sportspeople from Brixen
Germanophone Italian people
21st-century Italian people